Hassan Ali Bechara (March 17, 1945 – July 24, 2017) was a Lebanese wrestler. At the 1980 Summer Olympics, at the age of 35, he won the bronze medal in the men's Greco-Roman Super Heavyweight category. He was born in Beirut.

References
 Hassan Bechara's profile at Sports Reference.com
 Hassan Bechara's obituary 

1945 births
2017 deaths
Sportspeople from Beirut
Lebanese male sport wrestlers
Olympic wrestlers of Lebanon
Wrestlers at the 1968 Summer Olympics
Wrestlers at the 1972 Summer Olympics
Wrestlers at the 1980 Summer Olympics
Olympic bronze medalists for Lebanon
Olympic medalists in wrestling
Medalists at the 1980 Summer Olympics